Gautier Ott (born 7 January 2002) is a French professional footballer who played as a left winger for Liga Portugal 2 club Académico de Viseu, on loan from Regionalliga Südwest side Hoffenheim II.

Club career 
Ott made his professional debut for Nancy in a 2–1 Ligue 2 loss to Clermont on 28 February 2020. In June 2020, he signed for German club Hoffenheim.

References

External links
 
 
 
 
 

2002 births
Living people
French footballers
French expatriate footballers
Footballers from Strasbourg
France youth international footballers
Association football wingers
SC Schiltigheim players
AS Nancy Lorraine players
TSG 1899 Hoffenheim players
TSG 1899 Hoffenheim II players
Académico de Viseu F.C. players
Ligue 2 players
Regionalliga players
Liga Portugal 2 players
French expatriate sportspeople in Germany
French expatriate sportspeople in Portugal
Expatriate footballers in Germany
Expatriate footballers in Portugal